The Donald W. Wyatt Detention Facility was established in 1993 as the nation’s first publicly owned and privately operated adult secure correctional facility and is currently operated by the Central Falls Detention Facility Corporation. This special non-profit, quasi-public detention facility was developed for use by the United States Marshal Service (USMS) in the Northeast and was later extended to include the U.S. Immigration and Customs Enforcement (ICE) from 2005 to 2008 and again starting in 2019.
Beginning in October 2011, the facility began serving the United States Navy, housing Navy personnel who have been placed in the custody of the General Court-Martial Convening Authority (GCMC).
The facility operates at maximum security utilizing an architectural and high-tech design and construction containment system. A $47 million expansion was completed in December 2006 and increased the maximum occupancy from 300 all-male housing to its current capacity of 770 including a 40-bed unit for female detainees.  It is the corporation's only facility.

Overview 

The facility was the very first privately run detention center in the United States. The prison was built in the city of Central Falls, Rhode Island. The city of Central Falls contributed funds towards its construction. The prison was created to generate employment in order to replace industrial jobs from closed textile mills.

Officers are paid $22 an hour in conjunction with shift differentials and roll call incentives while completing their probationary first year of employment. Officers are given an additional wage increase upon successful completion of their one-year probationary period. 
Officers and Sergeants employed by the Donald W. Wyatt Detention Facility are represented by the Fraternal Order of Police lodge # 50.

Protest

Protests against the Wyatt started when the facility renewed its contract with ICE in March, 2019. On March 28, a group of local activists from Central Falls led a march from City Hall to the detention center.
That summer, the Jewish organization Never Again Action organized a protest on July 3, at which 18 people were arrested, and another protest on August 14, at which a Wyatt employee drove his truck into the crowd. Since then, a variety of local groups have continued protesting the facility.

Escapes 
James Morales was discovered missing from the Wyatt Detention Facility in Central Falls on Saturday, Dec. 31 2016, at around 10 p.m. He had been detained at the facility since Dec. 3, 2015, on federal criminal charges brought in U.S. District Court in Worcester, Massachusetts.

Since the escape was reported to law enforcement by the Wyatt staff, federal, state and local authorities in multiple jurisdictions investigated and analyzed numerous leads on Morales’ potential whereabouts. Additionally, law enforcement continues to analyze and follow up on information gathered from locations Morales may have visited since his escape, as well as from evidence seized by law enforcement.

Morales is a former U.S. Army reservist who was being held for allegedly stealing six assault rifles and 10 handguns from the Lincoln Stoddard Army Reserve Center in Worcester in 2015.

It is believed that Morales fled into Attleboro, where a Massachusetts State Police dog followed his trail to an overpass, where bloody prison clothing was found. Authorities believe Morales got into a car at that point.

According to police, Morales may also have stolen a green Chevrolet Lumina with Rhode Island license plate 408696 from a Burger King lot in Attleboro at about 7:30 a.m. Sunday.

Morales was captured five days after his escape by a Massachusetts State Trooper and two Somerville Police detectives in Somerville following a foot pursuit, after Morales attempted to rob a Bank of America in Somerville, Mass.

Deaths 
Death of Hiu Lui Ng- 
Hiu Lui "Jason" Ng, an immigrant from China, was an ICE Detainee who died while in custody of the Donald W. Wyatt Facility.  
The official cause of his death was cancer. In February 2009, the Rhode Island ACLU filed a lawsuit on behalf of Ng's family, alleging “cruel, inhumane, malicious and sadistic behavior” against him. In 2012, the lawsuit was settled, with a multi-million dollar payment to the family.

The United States Immigration and Customs Enforcement Agency withdrew its remaining 153 prisoners from the facility in mid-December 2008, following an inquiry into Ng's death.

The prison continues to house inmates of the United States Marshal Service and of the United States Navy's General Court-Martial Convening Authority (GCMC), and on March 10, 2019, it renewed its contract with ICE.

References

External links
Donald W. Wyatt Detention Facility

Prisons in Rhode Island
Buildings and structures in Central Falls, Rhode Island
Private prisons in the United States
Immigration detention centers and prisons in the United States
1993 establishments in Rhode Island